Zakariya Souleymane (born 29 December 1994) is a footballer who plays as a defender for Lyon La Duchère. Born in France, he represents the Niger national team.

Career
Born in Lyon, France, Souleymane played club football for Vaulx-en-Velin and Evian Thonon Gaillard.

He made his international debut for Niger in 2014.

References

External links
Zakaryia Souleymane at Footballdatabase

1994 births
Living people
People with acquired Nigerien citizenship
Nigerien footballers
Niger international footballers
French footballers
French people of Nigerien descent
Association football defenders
Thonon Evian Grand Genève F.C. players
AS Saint-Priest players
Championnat National 2 players
Championnat National 3 players
Footballers from Lyon
FC Vaulx-en-Velin players
Lyon La Duchère players